Edward Richards (1908–1991) was the Premier of Bermuda.

Edward Richards may also refer to:

Edward Windsor Richards (1831–1921), British engineer and steel maker
Billy Richards (rugby union), Australian rugby union player
Edwin Richards (field hockey) (1879–1930), Welsh field hockey player, sometimes referred to as Edward
Eddie Richards, British DJ
Edward Richards (Massachusetts politician), early settler of Dedham, Massachusetts
Barbara Ann Wilcox, born Edward Price Richards, American trans woman

See also
Ed Richards (disambiguation)
Ted Richards (disambiguation)